Recital de guitarra de Paco de Lucía (Paco de Lucía's Guitar Concert) is an album by Paco de Lucía.

Track listing
"El Vito" – 3:25
"Mi Inspiración" – 3:17
"Malagueña de Lecuona” – 4:32
"Serranía de Ronda" – 4:11
"Rumba Improvisada" – 4:05
"Temas del Pueblo" – 4:39
"Plazuela" – 3:52
"Zarda de Monty" – 2:59
"Andalucía de Lecuona" – 4:18
"Fuente Nueva" – 3:28

Musicians
Paco de Lucía – Flamenco guitar
Ramón de Algeciras – Flamenco guitar
Enrique Jimenez
Paco Cepero
Isidro Sanlucar
Julio Vallejo

References
 Gamboa, Manuel José and Nuñez, Faustino. (2003). Paco de Lucía. Madrid:Universal Music Spain.

1971 albums
Paco de Lucía albums